John Lampen (born 1938) is a Quaker peace educator and writer. He is married to Diana Lampen. In 1987, he gave the Swarthmore Lecture, entitled Mending Hurts.

For twenty years, he worked with emotionally disturbed adolescent boys at Shotton Hall School, Shropshire. One of his students, Andrew Liddell, states, "Mr Lampen and his family helped me to develop my character and core values. I will never forget them." Then John lived in South Africa for some months. He then moved to Derry in Northern Ireland, working in the communities with young people and seeking reconciliation.

Currently, Diana and John Lampen run a small training and consultancy agency, The Hope Project, based in Stourbridge, England, which works for peace in partnership with local organizations in Britain, Belarus, Bosnia, Croatia, Uganda and Ukraine.

Publications

Thoughts on aggression / with  Lennhoff, F. G.; Williams, A. Hyatt; Shrewsbury : Shotton Hall - 1972
Thinking About Conscience  / with Lennhoff, F.G., Shotton Hall Publications - 1974 
Towards Self-Discipline  / with Lennhoff F.G., Shotton Hall Publications  - 1975 
Wait in the light : the spirituality of George Fox : a selection of the writings of George Fox and early Friends - 1981
Will Warren : a scrapbook : a Quaker in Northern Ireland /  Introduction by Barritt, Denis Quaker Home Service - 1983 
Twenty questions about Jesus Quaker Home Service - 1985  reprinted 1995
"Sigmund Freud's attack on religion" In: The Friends' quarterly; (October 1985), p. 577-583 - 1985
Un Quaker en Irlande du Nord : un example d'action non-violente, Introduction by Barritt, Denis P. 1914-1993; Lampen, John, b. 1938; translated by Haywood, Nelly; Benoist, Odile.Lausanne : Centre Martin Luther King - 1985
If stones could speak: glimpses of a city over three hundred years [Londonderry] / with Speroy,A; Derry : North West Centre for Learning and Development (1985)
"Living in a violent society" In: The Friends' quarterly;  (January 1985), p. 431-435 - 1985
Mending hurts - (Swarthmore Lecture) - 1987
Introduction to A minority of one [sound recording] : the 1988 Swarthmore lecture by Gillman, Harvey - 1988
"Justice and peace" In: The Friends' quarterly(April 1989), p. 266-271 - 1989
A relaxation handbook : dealing with stress and becoming a more peaceful person/ with Lampen, Diana;  Derry : Yes! Publications, - 1991
The peace kit : everyday peace-making for young people / with Downey, Cormac. - 1992
Findings : poets and the crisis of faith Wallingford, PA : Pendle Hill Publications,(Pendle Hill pamphlets#310) - c1993 
"The Ulster Quaker Peace Education Project",  with Farrell, Seamus - in Countering bullying : initiatives by schools and local authorities / [edited by] Delwyn Tattum and Graham Herbert. 1993
Conflict-busters : the young people's guide to mediation in schools Londonderry : Quaker Peace Education Project - [1994?]
"Committed not to words but to a way" : a review of "Quaker faith & practice" (Britain Yearly Meeting, 1995) In: The Friends' quarterly (October 1995), p. 372-377 - 1995
The gospel of peace : the Biblical basis of pacifism Fellowship of Reconciliation - 1995, 
Building the Peace: Good Practice in Community Relations Work in Northern Ireland  Northern Ireland Community Relations Council  1995 
A guided journey / with Lampen, Diana; Philadelphia, Pa. : Wider Quaker Fellowship - 1997
Young people handling conflict : a training course for teenagers / with  Lampen, Diana; Wheeldon, Andrew / Quaker Peace Centre (Cape Town). - 1997
Instruments of peace : unofficial peace workers in protracted social conflicts Thesis submitted to University of London, King's College Department of War Studies - 1998 (copy at Friends House Library, Euston)
No alternative? : nonviolent responses to repressive regimes York, Sessions - 2000 
The peace kit / with Downey, Cormac. - 2005 reprinted 2007
Endeavours to mend : perspectives on British Quaker work in the world today / with Phillips, Brian David Quaker Books, - 2006 
Finding the words : Quaker experience and language Stourbridge, The Hope Project - [2007] (8 pages)
"The intellectual background to the early Quaker message" In: The Friends' quarterly;  (January 2008), p. 1-7 - 2008
Seeing, hearing, knowing : reflections on Experiment with Light York, Sessions - 2008 
"Truth and powerlessness" In: The Friends' quarterly(July 2009), p. 3-9 - 2009
The worship kit : a young person's guide to Quaker worship Quaker Books - 2010 
Answering the Violence: Encounters with Perpetrators, Pendle Hill pamphlet series No. 412, Wallingford, PA, Pendle Hill Quaker Center (2011)

References

English Quakers
1938 births
Living people
Peace education
Quaker writers